Eucapnopsis is a genus of small winter stoneflies in the family Capniidae. There are at least 2 described species in Eucapnopsis.

Species
 Eucapnopsis brevicauda Claassen, 1924 (short-tailed snowfly)
 Eucapnopsis stigmatica Okamoto, 1922

References

 DeWalt R, Cao Y, Tweddale T, Grubbs S, Hinz L, Pessino M, Robinson J (2012). "Ohio USA stoneflies (Insecta, Plecoptera): species richness estimation, distribution of functional niche traits, drainage affiliations, and relationships to other states". ZooKeys 178: 1-26.

Further reading

 

Plecoptera